Tomlinson Stadium–Kell Field is a baseball venue located in Jonesboro, Arkansas, United States.  It has been home to the Arkansas State Red Wolves college baseball team of the Division I Sun Belt Conference since 1993.  The venue has a capacity of 1,200 people.

The stadium is named after former Arkansas State baseball coach and athletic director J.A. "Ike" Tomlinson, who coached ASU baseball from 1944–1976.  His tenure set a record for longest-serving athletic coach in Arkansas State history which still stands today.  The field is named after brothers George and Skeeter Kell, both of whom played baseball at Arkansas State and went on to play in the Major Leagues.

In 1996, lights were added at the facility, allowing night games to be played there for the first time.  In 2003, a new batter's eye was constructed past the center field fence.  A deck and picnic area, Barton's Baseball Deck, was added in 2007.  In 2008, new chairback and handicap seats were added behind home plate, moving the backstop closer to the field.

A record 1,143 people attended Arkansas State's May 13, 2014, game against the Ole Miss Rebels.  The Rebels defeated Arkansas State 16–9.

See also
 List of NCAA Division I baseball venues

References

College baseball venues in the United States
Arkansas State Red Wolves baseball
Baseball venues in Arkansas
Buildings and structures in Jonesboro, Arkansas